Loughborough Carillon is a carillon tower and war memorial in Loughborough, England. It is in Queen's Park, and is a well-known landmark, visible from several miles away.

Plans were finalised in 1919 and when completed in 1923 it was the first four-octave carillon in England, the concept being associated with Belgium where so many British servicemen lost their lives during the 1914–1918 Great War.  The Carillon was designed by Sir Walter Tapper, and is now grade II listed.
The carillon has 47 bells, all of which were cast at John Taylor Bell Foundry in Loughborough. The carillon was built by William Moss and Sons Ltd of Loughborough.

The dedication was held on Sunday 22 July 1923, led by Theodore Woods, Bishop of Peterborough, and Field-Marshal William Robertson. The carillon was played by city carillonneur Jef Denyn, and the service included a piece Memorial Chimes composed by Edward Elgar for the occasion - the manuscript of which, donated to Charnwood Borough Council in the 1950s, was rediscovered in 2012.

There are recitals every Thursday (1300 till 1400) and Sunday (1300 till 1400) throughout the summer.

The Carillon is a grade II listed building.

War Memorial Museum
The tower features the War Memorial Museum, with three floors of military memorabilia.  Exhibits include artifacts from each of the armed forces and both World Wars.

Access up the tower is via a long spiral staircase, which precludes disabled access except to the ground floor.

The bells

In popular culture
The song "Loughborough Suicide" by Indie group Young Knives starts with the line "I looked down from the carillon".

See also
 List of carillons of the British Isles

References

External links 

 War Memorial and Peace Carillons website - About the Loughborough War Memorial Carillon
 Loughborough Carillon Tower and War Memorial Museum
 Pictures of the Carillon
 Loughborough Roll of Honour
 Loughborough Carillon and War Memorial Museum – Go Leicestershire

Bell towers in the United Kingdom
Buildings and structures in Leicestershire
Carillons
Grade II listed buildings in Leicestershire
Carillon
Military and war museums in England
Monuments and memorials in Leicestershire
Museums in Leicestershire
Towers completed in 1923
World War I memorials in England